Plainfield is a NJ Transit railroad station on the Raritan Valley Line, in Plainfield, Union County, New Jersey, United States.  One of two train stations in Plainfield, this station serves the central part of the city.  The ticket office and waiting area are in the south side station house (the eastbound platform).  It was the westernmost station on the line with ADA accessibility, until Somerville's new high-level platforms were opened on December 7, 2010.

History
Plainfield station was originally built by Bradford L. Gilbert and Joseph Osgood for the Central Railroad of New Jersey in 1902. As with the rest of the CNJ, the station was subsidized by the New Jersey Department of Transportation in 1964 and absorbed into Conrail in 1976. The station is one of the two surviving CNJ stations in Plainfield (the other being Netherwood station), whereas the community previously had five; the other three being at Grant Avenue, Clinton Avenue, and another station named Evona. It been listed in the state and federal registers of historic places since 1984 and along with Netherwood is part of the Operating Passenger Railroad Stations Thematic Resource.  The station underwent a reconstruction project in 2010 and kept its listing.

Station layout

The station has two high-level side platforms.

See also
List of New Jersey Transit stations
National Register of Historic Places listings in Union County, New Jersey

References

External links

world.nycsubway.org - NJT Raritan Line including Plainfield Station
Raritan Valley Line (Unofficial NJTransit Homepage) 
 Watchung Avenue entrance from Google Maps Street View
 Station House from Google Maps Street View
 Park Avenue entrance from Google Maps Street View

NJ Transit Rail Operations stations
NJT station
Railway stations in Union County, New Jersey
Former Central Railroad of New Jersey stations
Former Baltimore and Ohio Railroad stations
Railway stations on the National Register of Historic Places in New Jersey
Renaissance Revival architecture in New Jersey
Railway stations in the United States opened in 1839
National Register of Historic Places in Union County, New Jersey
1839 establishments in New Jersey